James Jeremiah "Miah" Norberg (20 September 1870 – 28 March 1935) was an Irish hurler. His career included back-to-back All-Ireland Championship victories with the Cork senior hurling team.

Playing career

Blackrock

Norberg joined the Blackrock senior team at a time when the club dominated hurling in Cork. He claimed his first silverware in 1891 when the club defeated inniscarra by 4–04 to no score to win the Cork County Championship. After the defeat at the hands of Redmonds in the 1892 final, Norberg won a second county title in 1893 when Blackrock avenged the previous year's defeat with a 2–05 to 1–01 victory over Redmonds. It was the first of three successive championship titles, with defeats of Blarney in 1894 and Ballyhea in 1895 bringing his championship medal tally to four from five successive final appearances. After a one-year absence, Blackrock were back in the 1897 final, with Norberg winning a fifth championship medal after a 5–08 to no score defeat of Aghada. He ended his career by collecting a sixth championship winners' medal after Blackrock's 2–09 to 0–20 win over Carrigtwohill in the 1898 final.

Cork

Having played no part in the 1892 Munster Championship, Norberg earned inclusion on the Cork senior hurling team in advance of the delayed 1892 All-Ireland final against Dublin. He ended the game with his first winners' medal after the 2–03 to 1–05 victory. Norberg added a Munster Championship medal to his collection after Cork's 5–03 to no score win over Limerick in the 1893 Munster final. He was again included on the team for the 1893 All-Ireland final, ending the game with a second successive winners' medal after the 6–08 to 0–02 victory over Kilkenny. Norberg won a second Munster Championship title in 1894 after Cork secured a third successive championship following a 3–04 to 1–02 win over Tipperary. He was selected as a quarter-back partner to Willie John O'Connell for the 1894 All-Ireland final against Dublin, ending the game by becoming one of the first players to win three successive All-Ireland medals after the 5–20 to 2–00 victory. Four-in-a-row eluded Norberg after Cork withdrew in protest from the 1895 All-Ireland Championship, however, he was again included on the Cork team that lost back-to-back Munster final defeats to Tipperary in 1896 and Limerick in 1897.

Personal life and death

Norberg was born in Ballintemple, Cork, the eldest of three children of James and Mary (née Cleary). His father, a native of Sweden, was a master mariner  who had settled in Cork. After a brief education, Norberg spent his entire working life as a market gardener. He married Margaret Kearney (1886-1964) in Innishannon in November 1908. They lived in a house in Ballinlough, Cork and had four children. Norberg's grandson, Frank Norberg, captained Cork during the 1972 All-Ireland Championship.

On 28 March 1935, Norberg died aged 64 at the County Home in Cork after suffering heart and kidney failure the previous day.

Honours

Blackrock
Cork Senior Hurling Championship (6): 1891, 1893, 1894, 1895, 1897, 1898

Cork
All-Ireland Senior Hurling Championship (3): 1892, 1893, 1894
Munster Senior Hurling Championship (2): 1893, 1894

Sources
 Corry, Eoghan, The GAA Book of Lists (Hodder Headline Ireland, 2005).
 Cronin, Jim, A Rebel Hundred: Cork's 100 All-Ireland Titles.
 Donegan, Des, The Complete Handbook of Gaelic Games (DBA Publications Limited, 2005).

References

1870 births
1935 deaths
Blackrock National Hurling Club hurlers
Cork inter-county hurlers
All-Ireland Senior Hurling Championship winners